Aut Aut is a critical philosophy and literary magazine published in Milan, Italy. Its name is of Latin origin and refers to existential choice and also, to Søren Kierkegaard's either/or conceptualization.

History and profile
Subtitled Rivista di filosofia e di cultura, Aut Aut was founded in 1951 by Enzo Paci. Enzo Paci was also the editor-in-chief of the magazine until his death in 1976. The magazine is based in Milan.

Aut Aut has a phenomenological and existentialist orientation. The magazine covers articles on philosophy, literature, sociology, linguistics and also, on architecture and urbanism.

Gillo Dorfles is among the significant former contributors. Roberto Sanesi started his career as a critic in the magazine in the 1950s. Pierre Aldo Rovatti was on the editorial board of the magazine between 1974 and 1976. During that period it became a significant forum for the discussions of Marxism and poststructuralism. Afterwards it continued to be published as a critical magazine.

See also
 List of magazines in Italy

References

External links

1951 establishments in Italy
Italian-language magazines
Literary magazines published in Italy
Magazines established in 1951
Magazines published in Milan
Philosophy magazines
Visual arts magazines published in Italy
Weekly magazines published in Italy